Vinayak Nagar is a locality and a ward in Neredmet neighbourhood of Hyderabad city.  It falls under Malkajgiri mandal of Medchal-Malkajgiri district of Indian State of Telangana. It is administered as Ward No. 137 of Greater Hyderabad Municipal Corporation.

Etymology 
Vinayak Nagar was earlier called as Gubadi Gutta or Gubadi hill. Before 1970's this was forest area in Neredmet Village. In 1980's the total area was encorched by local people converted it as a Basti or Slum, And also named as Vinayak Nagar.

Locaties of Vinayak Nagar

 Vinayak Nagar Basthi
 Tarkrama Nagar Basthi
 East Dinakar Nagar Colony
 West Dinakar Nagar Colony

Transportation
Vinayak Nagar is well connected by TSRTC city bus services with Secunderabad and ECIL X Roads. Nearest railway station is Safilguda railway station and nearest metro is Mettuguda metro station.

References 

 

Neighbourhoods in Hyderabad, India
Municipal wards of Hyderabad, India